The communist insurgency in Burma (present-day Myanmar) was waged primarily by the Communist Party of Burma (abbr. CPB; colloquially the "white flags") and the Communist Party (Burma) ("red flags") from 1948 to 1989. The conflict ended when the CPB, severely weakened by an internal mutiny, disbanded its armed wing.

Origins

World War II 
While in Insein Prison in July 1941, Thakin Soe and Thakin Than Tun coauthored the Insein Manifesto, which declared fascism "the major enemy in the coming war" and called for temporary cooperation with the British and the establishment of a broad alliance that would include the Soviet Union. It followed the popular front line advocated by Bulgarian communist leader Georgi Dimitrov at the Seventh Comintern Congress in 1935.

This was against the prevailing opinion of the nationalist We Burmans Association (the "Thakins"), including Aung San, who had secretly left Burma in 1940 with a group of young intellectuals, later known as the Thirty Comrades, to receive military training from the Japanese. Aung San and the Thirty Comrades returned to Burma in 1941 and established the Burma Independence Army (BIA) to fight against the Allies. Upon their capture of Rangoon in 1942, the Japanese established a puppet state in Burma  and later installed Aung San as its Deputy Prime Minister in August 1943. The BIA was also reorganised as the puppet state's armed forces, the Burma National Army (BNA).

Thakin Soe had gone underground in the Irrawaddy Delta to organise armed resistance soon after the invasion, and Thakin Than Tun as Minister of Land and Agriculture was able to pass on intelligence to Thakin Soe. Thakin Thein Pe and Tin Shwe made contact in July 1942 with the exiled colonial government in Simla, India. In January 1944 at a secret meeting near Dedaye in the Delta, the CPB successfully held its First Congress chaired by Thakin Soe.

Aung San became increasingly skeptical of Japan's ability to win the war as time progressed, and in mid-1944 he decided to switch sides, reaching out to his former comrades in the CPB. The CPB, together with the BNA and the People's Revolutionary Party (PSP) formed the Anti-Fascist Organisation (AFO) at a secret meeting in Pegu in August 1944. The AFO was later renamed the Anti-Fascist People's Freedom League (AFPFL) on 3 March 1945. Five days later on 8 March 1945, the communist commander Ba Htoo of the northwest command based in Mandalay started a rebellion against the Japanese. The rebellion escalated into a national uprising on 27 March 1945, led by the BNA under the command of Aung San. Japanese forces capitulated by July 1945, and the AFPFL became Burma's most influential political party in the post-war years leading up to independence and for several years after independence was achieved.

Post-World War II developments 
Thakin Soe and Ba Tin travelled to India in September 1945 to talk to the Communist Party of India, where Browderism was already under attack, and Thakin Soe came back convinced that armed struggle was the only way forward. Amidst widespread strikes starting with the Rangoon Police and mass rallies, the new British Governor Sir Hubert Rance offered Aung San and the others seats in the Executive Council. Aung San initially refused the offer but eventually accepted it in September 1946. The CPB had by now abandoned the Browderist line, and a rift that had opened up between the party and Aung San with the socialists culminated in Thakin Than Tun being forced to resign as general secretary of the AFPFL in July of that year, a position he had held since its inception. The party was finally expelled from the AFPFL on 2 November after the communists had accused Aung San and the socialists of "kneeling before imperialism", selling out by joining the Executive Council, and calling off the general strike.

In February 1946 Thakin Soe denounced the CPB's leadership, accusing them of Browderism, the form of revisionism espoused by Earl Browder, leader of the American Communist Party. Browder argued that armed revolution would no longer be necessary to establish a dictatorship of the proletariat, as world fascism and imperialism had been weakened, making constitutional methods a real option to achieve "national liberation". Thakin Thein Pe, who had replaced Thakin Soe as secretary general, was the leader responsible for the policy paper on strategy entitled Toward Better Mutual Understanding and Greater Cooperation written in India and adopted at the party's Second Congress at Bagaya Road, Rangoon in July 1945. Thakin Soe broke away from the CPB to form a splinter group called the Communist Party (Burma) or CP(B) for short. The CP(B) was popularly nicknamed the "red flag communists" as they continued to use the CPB's original red-coloured flag. The majority remained with Thakin Than Tun and Thakin Thein Pe and continued to cooperate with the AFPFL; they were nicknamed the "Thein-Than communists" by the Rangoon press and were popularly known as the "white flag communists" for their use of new white-coloured party flags. During negotiations the British noticed that Thakin Than Tun was the thinker behind Aung San, as Aung San often referred to his brother-in-law for his opinion. In the end the CPB failed to achieve "leftist unity" with Aung San and the socialists led by U Nu and Kyaw Nyein within the AFPFL.

In February 1947, Ba Thein Tin and communist student leader Aung Gyi attended the British Empire Conference of Communist Parties in London, the first time the CPB took part in an international communist forum. After denouncing the elections to the Constituent Assembly that took place the following April, the party fielded 25 junior candidates but won just 7 seats. The assassination of Aung San and his cabinet members on 19 July stunned the CPB as much as the rest of the country, but the party was still anxious to build a united front with the AFPFL to drive the British out of Burma, convinced that the assassination was an imperialist plot to stop Aung San from achieving leftist unity.

U Nu concluded negotiations that Aung San had started with the British premier Clement Attlee in London, and the Nu-Attlee Treaty of October 1947 was condemned as a sham by the communists, the bone of contention in particular being the Let Ya-Freeman Defence Agreement, appended as an annexe to the treaty. It provided for an initial period of three years for a British military training mission to remain in the country and a possible future military alliance with Britain. This was to the CPB proof of British intention to subvert Burma's sovereignty and U Nu's capitulation.

U Nu called for a new coalition between communists and socialists on 8 November 1947, urging negotiations between the CPB, the PSP, and the People's Volunteer Organisation (PVO), an association of World War II veterans which served as Aung San's private army. When the attempted coalition failed, U Nu accused the communists of gathering arms for an insurrection. The impact of communist campaigning against the treaty left its mark in Burma's decision not to join the British Commonwealth. Yèbaw Ba Tin, the CPB's Burma-born Bengali theoretician, released a thesis in December 1947 titled, On the Present Political Situation and Our Tasks which set out a revolutionary strategy reviving the slogan "final seizure of power" from the previous January, and called for a "national rising to tear up the treaty of slavery", nationalisation of all British and foreign assets, the abolition of all forms of landlordism and debt, the dismantling of the state bureaucracy and its replacement with a people's government, and alliances and trade agreements with "democratic China, fighting Vietnam and Indonesia" and other democratic countries resisting "Anglo-American imperialist domination". A twofold strategy would be followed: an escalating campaign of strikes by workers and government employees in Rangoon and other cities, and the establishment of "liberated" areas in the countryside to be defended by Red Guards consisting of PVOs trained in guerrilla warfare.

February 1948 saw a wave of strikes in Rangoon by the All Burma Trade Union Congress (ABTUC) backed by the CPB, and in March 1948 a 75,000-strong mass rally by the All Burma Peasants Organisation (ABPO) took place in Pyinmana. U Nu ordered the arrest of the CPB's leaders, convinced that they were planning an uprising on Resistance Day, 27 March, only to find the CPB headquarters at Bagaya empty on the morning of. The party leadership had flown to their stronghold in Pyinmana to start an armed revolution.

Timeline

Insurgency against the AFPFL 
The CPB fired the first shots of their post-independence insurgency in Paukkongyi, Pegu Region, on 2 April 1948. Thakin Soe's red flag communists had already started a rebellion, as had the Arakanese nationalists led by the veteran monk U Seinda and the Muslim mujahideen in Arakan. The PVO had split into "white-band" and "yellow-band" factions; the majority white-band PVO led by Bo La Yaung (a member of the Thirty Comrades) and Bo Po Kun joined the insurrection in July 1948. U Nu's government deployed the Karen and Kachin Rifles to suppress the communist uprising, and took Pyay, Thayetmyo and Pyinmana during the latter half of 1948. The Karen National Union (KNU) rebelled at the end of January 1949 when Army Chief of Staff Smith Dun, an ethnic Karen, was replaced by Ne Win, a socialist commander and senior member of the Thirty Comrades after Aung San and Bo Let Ya. The Mon joined the Karen shortly afterwards, as did the Pa-O in Shan State. Three regiments of the Burma Rifles also went underground and formed the Revolutionary Burma Army (RBA), led by communist commanders Bo Zeya, Bo Yan Aung, and Bo Ye Htut, all members of the Thirty Comrades.

The CPB's appraisal of Burma as a "semi-colonial, semi-feudal" state led to the Maoist line of establishing guerrilla bases among the peasants in the countryside as opposed to mobilising the urban proletariat, although it continued to support above-ground leftist opposition parties such as the Burma Workers and Peasants Party (BWPP) led by trade union leaders Thakins Lwin and Chit Maung, and dubbed "crypto-communists" or "red socialists" by the Rangoon press. They tried unsuccessfully to bring the communists back into mainstream politics, and in 1956 formed an alliance called the National United Front to contest the election on a "peace ticket" winning 35% of the vote though only a small number of seats.

The politburo's decision to fight "for the very existence of our party" at a clandestine central committee meeting in April 1948 in Rangoon was confirmed the following month by the full plenum of the CC at Hpyu 120 miles north of the capital. The headquarters of the CPB remained on the move mostly in the forests and hills along the Sittang River valley, Pyinmana – Yamethin area in central Burma, sometimes north into the "Three M triangle" (Mandalay – Meiktila – Myingyan). Debt was abolished, and farming and trading cooperatives established in areas under their control. One year into the insurrection, its forces were reorganised along Maoist lines into a main force, mobile guerrilla forces, and local people's militia, with the command shared between military and political commissars. The main force was called the People's Liberation Army (PLA), homonymous with the People's Liberation Army of the People's Republic of China founded around the same time. In September 1950, the PLA merged with the RBA regiments under Bo Zeya's command and formed the People's Army (PA). Its regular forces consisted of four main divisions, each with a thousand armed troops.

The Karen National Union (KNU) with its "reactionary feudal leadership" was regarded by the CPB as being used by the British to destabilise the Union by both the AFPFL government and the communists, although Thakin Than Tun had supported the earlier Arakanese nationalist rebellion against the British, the Shan struggle against the feudal autocracy, and the Karen right to self-determination. The civil war was thus waged from three sides: the AFPFL, the communist PVOs and the ethnic minority nationalists with the KNU threatening Rangoon itself in early 1949. Nu estimated government casualties alone at 3,424 dead including 1,352 army personnel in 1952.

United fronts 
The first united front against the AFPFL, the People's Democratic Front (PDF), was established in Pyay in March 1949, after the town was captured by a joint CPB, RBA, and PVO force. The Tripartite Alliance Pact was the next, signed by Thakin Than Tun, Thakin Soe, and Bo Po Kun at the village of Alaungdaw Kathapa near Monywa on 1 October 1952. Apart from the CPB-RBA merger of September 1950 which formed the People's Army, the agreements mainly involved demarcation of territory and terms of cooperation.

In November 1952 a ceasefire agreement was reached between the CPB and the KNU, but a military alliance did not materialise until May 1959 in the form of the National Democratic United Front (NDUF). The surrender of smaller ethnic insurgent groups hastened the creation of the Democratic Nationalities United Front (DNUF), established in April 1956 by the KNU, which by then had become dominated by the Maoist Karen National United Party (KNUP) led by Mahn Ba Zan. The leftist turn of the KNU left it isolated from other ethnic insurgent groups, and it moved closer to the CPB despite the many staunch anti-communists in the veteran Christian leadership.

The NDUF also included the fledgling New Mon State Party (NMSP) led by Nai Shwe Kyin and formed after the surrender of the Mon People's Front (MPF), the Chin National Vanguard Party (CNVP) formed in March 1956, and the Karenni National Progressive Party (KNPP) led by Saw Maw Reh and formed in July 1957. Both the NMSP and the KNPP were founded with the help of the KNU. It was the most successful united front among the ethnic insurgent groups and lasted until 1976, when the KNU broke away from the NDUF to form the National Democratic Front (NDF). However, political differences remained unresolved as no compromise was possible between the CPB's position of regional autonomy for Burma's ethnic minorities (similar to the autonomous regions of China) and the ethnic minorities' demands for self-determination.

"Peace and unity" vs. "arms for democracy" 
The communist military offensive began to lose traction in the early 1950s; Burmese authorities outlawed the party in October 1953, and the CPB put forward the "peace and unity" proposal in 1955. It combined a strong peace movement by its above-ground supporters and sympathizers and proposals by Thakin Than Tun to the AFPFL government in 1956. War-weariness had led to a desire for peace, and the move was welcomed by both the leftist opposition and conservative groups in Rangoon. Thakin Kodaw Hmaing, the revered veteran nationalist leader, formed an Internal Peace Committee which in 1958 was allowed by the government to speak on the CPB's behalf. The results of the 1956 election, where the National United Front did very well on a peace ticket, had also given the AFPFL a jolt.

On the international front, U.S. support of the Kuomintang (KMT) forces, that had crossed over from Yunnan province into northeastern Burma after Mao's victory in China, had resulted in Burma's refusal to join the Southeast Asia Treaty Organisation (SEATO). Zhou Enlai visited Rangoon on his return from the Geneva Conference on Indo-China to meet U Nu, and issued a joint communique reaffirming the "five principles of peaceful coexistence" and the right of people "to choose their own state system"; U Nu repaid the visit the same year receiving the assurance that Chinese leaders had no contact with the CPB. Ne Win also led a military delegation to Beijing in 1957, and met Chairman Mao Zedong. A week-long visit in December 1955 by Nikolai Bulganin and Nikita Khrushchev appeared to endorse Burma as a model non-aligned, socialist Third World country developing at its own pace; Burma was a strong supporter of the 1955 Bandung Conference. Joseph Stalin's death and the shift in Soviet policy under Khrushchev contributed to the mood of national reconciliation.

U Nu then turned the communist peace offensive to his advantage and came up with a very successful "arms for democracy" offer. Tatmadaw (Burma Armed Forces) offensives in early 1956, Operation Aung Thura ("Valiant Victory") in Pakokku area and Operation Aung Tayza ("Glorious Victory") in Pathein area, had been partly successful. The year 1958 saw mass surrenders of first the Arakanese nationalists led by U Seinda, next the Pa-O, Mon, and Shan communists, but most importantly the PVO led by Bo Po Kun. The official figure was 5,500 armed insurgents that "entered the light", of which about 800 were white flag communists mainly in Sittwe, northern Rakhine State. The one crucial exception was the KNU.

1962 coup d'état and peace parley 
Ne Win's caretaker government presided over a general election in February 1960 which saw the return of U Nu to office after his faction of the Clean AFPFL, renamed the Union Party, won a landslide majority over the Stable AFPFL. Parliamentary democracy this time, however, lasted just two years before Ne Win staged a coup d'état on 2 March 1962. A major crackdown on the above-ground opposition followed, with most of the remaining leaders of the AFPFL and ethnic community leaders being rounded up and imprisoned. A peaceful student-led protest at Rangoon University on 7 July 1962 was brutally suppressed by the Tatmadaw, ending in a massacre of over a hundred students.

In the mid-1960s the United States State Department estimated the CPB's membership to be approximately 5,000.

1963 peace talks 
As head of the Union Revolutionary Council (URC) government, Ne Win launched a peace offensive starting with a general amnesty on 1 April 1963. Bo Ye Htut, a member of the Thirty Comrades and the central military committee of the CPB who had been to Rangoon on a secret peace mission before the 1958 AFPFL split, took the offer together with Bo Ye Maung and Bo Sein Tin. The KNU split in the same month between the Karen National Unity Party (KNUP) and the Karen Revolutionary Council (KRC) led by Saw Hunter Tha Hmwe. The red flag communists' delegation was the first to arrive in Rangoon in June, later joined by the red flag leader Thakin Soe himself from Arakan in August. After just three meetings the talks were abruptly ended by the URC on 20 August and the red flag communists were flown back to the Arakanese capital Sittwe.

Three CPB teams led by Bo Zeya, Yebaw Aung Gyi, Thakins Pu, and Ba Thein Tin arrived in July and September by air from China. These "Beijing returnees" were allowed to travel to the party's jungle headquarters in the Pegu Yoma near Paukkaung, where the leadership, reunited after 15 years, held a historic meeting of the central committee. Talks began on 2 September after the CPB delegation headed by the general secretary Yebaw Htay and the People's Army's chief of staff Bo Zeya arrived on 28 August. A second team headed by Thakin Zin, politburo member and secretary of the NDUF which agreed to negotiate as one team, arrived on 20 September. Meetings with the CPB and NDUF overshadowed those with other nationalities such as the Shan and Kachin delegations.

Talks broke down on 14 November, when the URC presented the CPB with the following demands:
 All troops must be concentrated in a designated area.
 No one can leave without permission.
 All organisational work must stop.
 All fundraising must stop.

Expectations had been running high, and the People's Peace Committee, set up by the NUF and supported by Thakin Kodaw Hmaing and former brigadier Kyaw Zaw, staged a Six-District Peace March in early November from Minhla to Rangoon. The marchers were cheered and applauded along the entire route by large crowds chanting anti-government slogans, and given food parcels collected by the Rangoon University Students Union (RUSU) and the All Burma Federation of Student Unions (ABFSU). When they reached Rangoon at a mass rally of 200,000 in front of city hall, speakers openly supported the NDUF's demand to keep its weapons and territory. Although at first the CPB and NDUF had misinterpreted Ne Win's peace offensive as a sign of weakness desperate for a solution, once they arrived in Rangoon they realised it was going to be a mainly cosmetic exercise. They therefore took the opportunity to re-establish contacts and meet family and friends.

Over 900 people were arrested in the immediate aftermath, mostly BWPP and NUF activists, but also Thaton Hla Pe, leader of the Union Pa-O National Organisation (UPNO) and formerly of the insurgent Pa-O National Organisation (PNO), who was one of the main organisers of the peace march, and Nai Non Lar leader of the former Mon People's Front (MPF). By the end of the year over 2,000 were believed to be in prison. Almost the entire executive committees of the RUSU and the ABFSU fled to join the CPB.

The CPB's return to Maoism 
Frustrated with the failure of the 1963 peace talks and inspired by Cultural Revolution in China, the CPB abandoned its previous position of "peace and unity" and returned to a revolutionary Maoist line. A mass campaign of purges and summary executions immediately followed, characterised by the Rangoon press as a policy of "purge, dismiss, and eliminate". Much of the party's old guard, as well as several student leaders who had joined the CPB after the failed 1963 peace talks, were killed under the orders of Thakin Than Tun.

Recommitting itself to Mao Zedong Thought, in 1965 the CPB began constructing rural bases called "Red Power areas", managed by "hardcore" activists who would encircle the cities from the countryside and eventually launch a "final seizure of power" when conditions permitted. A central party school for political training in Mao Zedong Thought was established and its first course was taught on 25 March 1965. These efforts by the CPB were openly supported by the CCP, which provided the CPB with arms and funding.

However, growing dissension within the party prompted Thakin Than Tun, Thakin Chit, and the Beijing returnees to meet on 16 August 1966 to decide on a strategy to remedy this "issue". Drawing on the practices of China's Red Guards, they established youth teams and handpicked the university and high school students who would lead the party's majority faction in purging their opponents.

Several senior party officials were labelled "revisionists" and purged. Thakin Ba Tin and Yèbaw Htay were suspended from the politburo on 27 April 1967, while a number of other senior members, such as Yèbaw Ba Khet, left the party, sensing the impending danger. Thakin Ba Tin was summarily tried and executed on 18 June 1967, followed by Yèbaw Htay, whose own son formed part of the execution squad. They were dubbed Burma's "Deng Xiaoping" and "Liu Shaochi" respectively. Thakin Than Tun and the remaining politburo passed a resolution on 15 December 1967 to adopt the "intraparty revolutionary line" and ordered party cadres across the country to carry out their own purges. Bo Yan Aung, who accompanied Aung San to Xiamen in search of military training abroad and was the first of the Thirty Comrades, was the next major victim of the purges on 26 December 1967. In August 1968, Bo Tun Nyein, who had led the executions of Thakin Ba Tin, Yèbaw Htay and Bo Yan Aung, was himself executed after being charged with "trying to set up a rival party headquarters". Former leaders of the RUSU, such as Aung Thein Naing (nephew of Bo Yan Aung) and Soe Win (son of Ludu U Hla and Ludu Daw Amar), met the same fate the next month.

Ne Win's government took advantage of the chaos and confusion within the CPB and launched a massive military offensive against the party in 1968, which resulted in the deaths of several more senior CPB officials. Bo Zeya, by that time the chief of staff of the People's Army, was killed in action on 16 April 1968, in a battle on the city borders of Pyay and Tharrawaddy. Yèbaw Tun Maung (Dr. Nath), the other Bengali founding member of the CPB besides Yèbaw Htay, was killed in action later the same year, near Hpyu in the Bago Yoma.

On 24 September 1968, while on the run from government troops, Thakin Than Tun was shot dead without warning by one of his bodyguards who later surrendered to Ne Win's government. The assassin had joined the CPB just two years prior as an "army deserter".

1980–1981 peace parley 
Shortly after Burma resigned from the Non-Aligned Movement in protest against Soviet and Vietnamese "manipulation" at the September 1979 Havana Conference, the Chinese Foreign Minister Huang Hua paid a visit to Rangoon. Ne Win announced an amnesty in 1980 which saw the return of U Nu and others from Thailand. The CPB responded with an attack on Mong Yawng, but proposed talks in September after letting the amnesty expire. The first meeting took place in Beijing in October between the teams led by Ba Thein Tin and Ne Win who paid a surprise visit to China leaving the Kachin delegation in the middle of the talks in Rangoon. At the second meeting headed by Thakin Pe Tint for the CPB and Maj. Gen. Aye Ko for the BSPP the following May in Lashio, three new conditions were put on the table by Aye Ko:

 The abolition of the CPB.
 The abolition of the People's Army under the command of the CPB.
 The abolition of all the "liberated areas".

The CPB was told that according to Article 11 of the 1974 Constitution which had established Burma as a one-party state there was no place for another political party. Ne Win ended the peace talks on 14 May and let the ceasefire deadline of 31 May with the KIO pass without replying to the Kachin position. There had been no ceasefire agreement with the CPB.

Across the border in China, the CPB-sympathetic "Voice of the People of Burma" (VOPB) began to broadcast appeals for ending the insurgency in Burma, developing democracy in the country and building national unity in a new multi-party system. The CPB still commanded 15,000 troops in the northeast, and the Tatmadaw, after resuming the Operation King Conqueror belatedly in 1982 and having suffered losses amounting to several hundred in the Kengtung-Tangyang area from CPB counter-attacks, finally retreated. Both sides now faced another challenge in the rising strength of the NDF formed in 1976, pointedly excluding the Bamar, by the ethnic insurgencies uniting the Karen, Mon, Kachin, Shan, Pa-O, Karenni, Kayan, Wa and Lahu, particularly with the return of the KIO in 1983 after its separate peace talks with the BSPP failed. This finally led to the CPB reaching an agreement with the NDF in 1986.

1989 mutiny 
On 16 April 1989, a group of mutineers stormed the CPB's headquarters in Pangsang and destroyed portraits of communist leaders and copies of communist literature. Many party members, including the senior leadership, were forced into exile and fled across the border into China. The party's ethnic Wa leaders in Pangsang later formed the United Wa State Army, while splinter groups led by Pheung Kya-shin and Sai Leun broke away and formed the Myanmar National Democratic Alliance Army and National Democratic Alliance Army respectively.

References

Citations

Sources 

 
 
 
 
 
 

Internal conflict in Myanmar
20th-century conflicts
History of Myanmar (1948–present)
Politics of Myanmar
Wars involving Myanmar
Revolution-based civil wars
Communism-based civil wars
Communist rebellions
Coup-based civil wars
Civil wars post-1945
Civil wars involving the states and peoples of Asia
Cold War conflicts